Bobby Worth (September 25, 1912 in Cleveland, Ohio – July 17, 2002 in Mission Hills, California) was an American songwriter. His best known songs are "Do I Worry?", "'Til Reveille", "Tonight We Love", and "Don't You Know?".

Worth was considered a child prodigy, performing in classical concerts at ten years of age. In his teens, he performed in Gus Edwards' vaudeville acts. In 1940, at age 28, he moved to Hollywood, California, and teamed with songwriter Stanley Cowan in 1941 to begin writing for movie studios.

From the 1940s onward, songs by Worth were recorded by prominent artists including Bing Crosby, Frank Sinatra, and Ella Fitzgerald. In collaboration with bandleader Freddy Martin and Ray Austin, he composed the song "Tonight We Love". He also co-composed the popular 1941 World War II tune, "(Lights Out) 'Til Reveille".

Songs in films
Films to which Worth contributed songs include:
1939 Sunset Trail  
1942 Pardon My Sarong
1943 Honeymoon Lodge
1944 In Society 
1946 Blue Bayou 
1946 Make Mine Music
1947 Fun and Fancy Free
1948 Melody Time 
1949 An Old-Fashioned Girl

Worth acted in the 1945 film, Penthouse Rhythm.

References

External links
List of Bobby Worth's songs registered with ASCAP
Variety magazine's obituary of Bobby Worth

Songwriters from Ohio
1912 births
2002 deaths
20th-century American composers